Isabelle Sadoyan (12 May 1928 – 10 July 2017) was a French-Armenian actress. She was the wife of actor Jean Bouise. Her filmography includes films by Jeanne Moreau, Claude Chabrol, Claude Lelouch, Luc Besson, Jean-Luc Godard, Henri Verneuil, Bertrand Tavernier,  Robert Kechichian and Krzysztof Kieślowski.

Partial filmography

1970: Les Choses - L'infirmière
1970: L'Alliance - Hélène
1972: Les Camisards - Madame Villeneuve
1975: Monsieur Klein - La femme à la consultation
1977: Cet obscur objet du désir - Jadiner
1979: L'Adolescente - Louise, la femme du maire
1980: La Banquière - Soeur Hermance
1980: L'Homme fragile - Luguette
1982: La Passante du Sans-Souci
1982: Le Retour de Martin Guerre - Catherine Boëre
1982: Les Fantômes du chapelier - Alice Kachoudas
1983: Itinéraire bis - Mme Panoux
1983: La Bête noire - Mme Guyot
1983: L'Air du crime - Yvette
1984: Partir, revenir - Anna, la gouvernante des Rivière
1984: Subway - La Femme du Prefet
1984: Tristesse et beauté - Mathilde
1985: Un homme et une femme : vingt ans déjà - La boulangère
1985:  - Angelina, la cuisinière
1987: Chateauroux district - Manou
1987: Soigne ta droite - La grand-mère
1987: Embrasse-moi - Gaby / Louise's grandmother
1988: La Couleur du vent - Grandmother
1989: Après la guerre - La Crochue
1990: Venins (In the Eye of the Snake) - Grandmother
1991: Mayrig - Anna
1992: 588 rue paradis - Anna
1993: Point d'orgue (TV Movie)
1993: Trois couleurs : Bleu - La servante
1994: Carences - Madame Martin
1995: Le Petit garçon - Cécile
1995: Péché véniel... péché mortel... - Grand-mère Lola
1995: L'Appât - Eric's grandmother
1995: Les Misérables - Mme Magloire
1996: Le huitième jour - la mère de Georges
1997: La Sicilia - Waarzegster
1999: Les Enfants du marais
2000: Origine contrôlée (de Zakia Bouchaala) - Aunt
2002: Aram - Tante Anouche
2005: Le Passager de l'été - Prudence
2004: Les Murs porteurs - Mme Mouchet
2006: Didine - Roberte
2008: Elles et Moi (TV Mini-Series) - Madame Bonel
2008: L'Heure d'été - Éloïse
2010: Des filles en noir - Sonia
2011: Un baiser papillon - Cliente salon de coiffure
2012: Thérèse Desqueyroux - Tante Clara
2013: Vandal - Grand-mère
2015: Heat Wave - Odette
2016: Irreplaceable - Madame veuve Werner - la mère de Jean-Pierre
2017: Ismael's Ghosts - Le fantôme de Rose
2018: Le doudou - Marie-Luce Gramont (final film role)

References

External links

Filmography 

1928 births
2017 deaths
French people of Armenian descent
Actresses from Lyon
20th-century French actresses
21st-century French actresses
French film actresses
French television actresses
French stage actresses